Corofin GAA  is a Gaelic Athletic Association club located in the village of Corofin, County Clare in Ireland. The club field teams in hurling and Gaelic football. The club has had many senior inter-county players over time.

Major honours
 Munster Intermediate Club Football Championship Runners-Up: 2006, 2021
 Clare Intermediate Football Championship (4): 1987, 2006, 2015 2021
 Clare Intermediate Hurling Championship (2): 1991, 2002
 Clare Junior A Football Championship (1): 1978
 Clare Junior A Hurling Championship (3): 1969, 1980, 2009
 Clare Football League Div. 2 (Garry Cup) (1): 2022
 Clare Under-21 A Hurling Championship (1): 2021 (with Ruan)
 Clare Under-21 A Football Championship Runners-Up: 2022
 Clare Minor A Hurling Championship (2): 2019 (with Ruan), 2020 (with Ruan)

Notable players
 Seamus Clancy
 Gerry Quinn

References

External links
Official Site

Gaelic games clubs in County Clare
Hurling clubs in County Clare